Sultan Azlan Shah University (Malay: Universiti Sultan Azlan Shah) (USAS) is a private university in Malaysia. Situated in Kuala Kangsar, Perak, it was previously known as Sultan Azlan Shah Islamic University College (KUISAS).

History 
Initially named as the Darul Ridzuan Islamic College (KISDAR), USAS was founded under the authority of the Islamic Religious Schools Enactment 1996. KISDAR was initiated  at the behest of the then Sultan of Perak Darul Ridzuan, the late Sultan Azlan Muhibbuddin Shah in 1986.

The institution was later realised in 1999 with its temporary campus located at Jalan Dato’ Seri Shaari, Off Jalan Raja DiHilir, Ipoh and officiated by Sultan Azlan Muhibbuddin Shah on October 16, 1999.

KISDAR was established under the Enactment No. 3 Year 2000, Perak Darul Ridzuan State Government Enactment. The enactment was tabled and approved by the Perak State Council on November 19, 2001, and was granted the legal title  by Sultan Azlan Muhibbuddin Shah on March 6, 2002.

On February 8, 2006, the Perak State Government had approved the construction of KISDAR's permanent campus on a 50-acre land, conferred by the then Regent of Perak, Raja Dr. Nazrin Shah as “waqf” at Chandan Putri, Kuala Kangsar. The construction of the permanent campus at a cost of RM 66 million was completed in 2008. On July 16, 2009, then Sultan of Perak Darul Ridzuan, Sultan Azlan Muhibbuddin Shah officiated the permanent campus of KISDAR.

KISDAR was later upgraded to university college status, known as Sultan Azlan Shah Islamic University College (KUISAS) and registered under the Private Higher Educational Institutions Act 1996 (Act 555) on March 4, 2013. Three years later, on June 10, 2016, the Prime Minister of Malaysia had proclaimed the upgrade of KUISAS as a full-fledged university with immediate effect. Subsequently, Universiti Sultan Azlan Shah (USAS) was officially established on June 15, 2016.

References

External links 
 Universiti Sultan Azlan Shah

Kuala Kangsar District
Universities and colleges in Perak
1999 establishments in Malaysia
Educational institutions established in 1999
Private universities and colleges in Malaysia